Rendition or Renditions may refer to:

Law
Rendition (law), a legal term meaning "handing over"
Extraordinary rendition, the apprehension and extrajudicial transfer of a person from one nation to another

Film & TV
Rendition (film), a 2007 film directed by Gavin Hood, starring Jake Gyllenhaal and Reese Witherspoon
"Rendition" (Torchwood), an episode of Torchwood
"Rendition" (The Walking Dead), an episode from season 11 of The Walking Dead

Music
Renditions (album), a 2011 studio album by English singer Amelia Warner under the name Slow Moving Millie
Renditions (EP), a 2015 EP by the American band SECRETS
"Rendition", a song by Manic Street Preachers from their 2007 album Send Away the Tigers

Games
Rendition (text adventure game), a 2007 political art experiment in text adventure form
Rendition: Guantanamo, a cancelled video game

Others
Rendition (company), a maker of 2D and 3D graphics chipsets for PCs
Renditions (magazine), a Hong Kong magazine featuring Chinese literature in English translation

See also 
Holomatix Rendition, a discontinued raytracing renderer
U.S. Renditions, a defunct American-based anime home video distributor
 Render (disambiguation)